Picture of Heath is an album by saxophonist Jimmy Heath featuring performances recorded in 1975 and originally released on the Xanadu label.

Reception

Scott Yanow of Allmusic states: "The great tenorman was clearly inspired by the stellar rhythm section resulting in one of his best blowing sessions".

Track listing
All compositions by Jimmy Heath except as indicated
 "For Minors Only" - 7:23   
 "Body and Soul" (Frank Eyton, Johnny Green, Edward Heyman, Robert Sour) - 7:24   
 "Picture of Heath"  - 5:59   
 "Bruh Slim" - 8:58   
 "All Members" - 5:12   
 "C.T.A." - 5:12

Personnel
Jimmy Heath - tenor saxophone, soprano saxophone
Barry Harris - piano
Sam Jones  - bass
Billy Higgins - drums

References

Xanadu Records albums
Jimmy Heath albums
1975 albums
Albums produced by Don Schlitten